A number of ships were named Duke of Argyll, including:

, Irish Sea ferry

Ship names